is a Peruvian international school (ペルー学校) in Isesaki, Gunma, Japan. A part of the Centro de Desarrollo Hispano Americano, it serves levels six months through preschool, primary school (years 1-6) and secondary school (years 1-5). It was established in 1999.

See also

 Peruvian migration to Japan
 Mundo de Alegría (Peruvian and Brazilian international school in Hamamatsu)
 Asociación Academia de Cultura Japonesa (Japanese international school in Lima, Peru)

References

External links
 Centro de Desarrollo Hispano Americano

Education in Gunma Prefecture
Elementary schools in Japan
International schools in Japan
Peruvian international schools
Educational institutions established in 1999
1999 establishments in Peru